Toshiko's Piano (released as Amazing Toshiko Akiyoshi in Japan) is the debut recording of jazz pianist Toshiko Akiyoshi.  It was recorded in Japan in 1953 with guitarist Herb Ellis, bassist Ray Brown and drummer J.C. Heard, who were known at the time for their work as pianist Oscar Peterson's rhythm section for Jazz at the Philharmonic concerts. The album was released as a 10 inch LP album on Norman Granz's Norgran Record label.  Later 12 inch LP and (Japanese) CD re-issues also include all 4 Akiyoshi tracks from 1957's Verve Records recording, Toshiko and Leon Sash at Newport.  The cover artwork is by David Stone Martin.

Track listing
LP side A 
"What Is This Thing Called Love?" (Porter) – 2:45
"Gone with the Wind" (Wrubel, Magidson) – 2:33
"I Want to Be Happy" (Youmans, Caesar) – 2:14
"Toshiko's Blues" (Akiyoshi) – 3:44
LP side B
"Shadrach" (MacGimsey) – 2:41
"Solidado" (Akiyoshi) – 3:29
"Squatty Roo" (Hodges) – 2:38
"Laura" (Raksin, Mercer) – 3:27

Additional four bonus tracks on later 12 inch LP and CD re-issues (from 1957 live recording, Toshiko...at Newport):
"Between Me and Myself" (Akiyoshi) – 5:38
"Blues for Toshiko" (Akiyoshi) – 5:38
"I'll Remember April" (Raye, DePaul, Johnston) – 7:05
"Lover" (Rodgers, Hart) – 5:45

Personnel
Tracks 1~8 (A1~B4 of original 10 inch LP)
Toshiko Akiyoshi – piano
Herb Ellis – guitar
Ray Brown – bass
J. C. Heard – drums
Tracks 9~12
Toshiko Akiyoshi – piano
Gene Cherico – bass
Jake Hanna – drums

References

Norgran MGN-22
Universal (J) UCCV 9050
Verve Japan MI3005

External links
Verve Records Discography Project

Toshiko Akiyoshi albums
1954 debut albums
Norgran Records albums
Albums produced by Norman Granz
Albums with cover art by David Stone Martin